Vladimir Vladimirovich Makhnutin (born 28 October 1987 in Chusovoy, Perm Krai), or Vladimir Machnutin, is a Russian luger who has competed since 1997. His best Luge World Cup finish was 15th in men's doubles in 2007–08.

Makhnutin's best finish at the FIL World Luge Championships was 16th in the men's doubles event twice (2007, 2008). He also finished 12th in the men's doubles event at the 2008 FIL European Luge Championships in Cesana.

Makhutin also qualified for the 2010 Winter Olympics where he finished tenth.

References
 FIL-Luge profile: Makhnutin, Vladimir

External links
 
 
 

1987 births
Living people
People from Chusovoy
Lugers at the 2010 Winter Olympics
Lugers at the 2014 Winter Olympics
Olympic lugers of Russia
Russian male lugers
Sportspeople from Perm Krai